SPCE may refer to:

 "SPCE", stock ticker symbol for Virgin Galactic
 Sardar Patel College of Engineering, Mumbai, India
 Shri Pillappa College of Engineering, Bangalore, Karnataka, India
 School of Professional and Continuing Education, University of Central Asia

See also

 Space (disambiguation)